Odhneria odhneri is a digenean parasite in the genus Odhneria of family Microphallidae. It infects several species of shorebirds, including the willet (Tringa semipalmata), as well as the marsh rice rat (Oryzomys palustris).

See also
List of parasites of the marsh rice rat

References

Literature cited
Kinsella, J.M. 1988. Comparison of helminths of rice rats, Oryzomys palustris, from freshwater and saltwater marshes in Florida. Proceedings of the Helminthological Society of Washington 55(2):275–280.
Sinclair, N.R. 1971. A reviewal of Odhneria odhneri Travassos, 1921 (Trematoda: Microphallidae) (subscription required). The Journal of Parasitology 57(5):980–982.

Animals described in 1921
Plagiorchiida